Georgia State Route 73 Bypass may refer to:

 Georgia State Route 73 Bypass (Glennville): a former bypass route that existed in Glennville
 Georgia State Route 73 Bypass (Statesboro): a bypass route that exists in Statesboro

073 Bypass